The Christian Flemish People's Union (CVV) was an electoral alliance sympathetic to the Flemish Movement which stood at the 1954 general elections in Belgium.

History
In the 1954 general elections the alliance received 3.9% of the Flemish vote, winning a single seat in the Chamber of Representatives. It was dissolved when the People's Union was formed on 21 November 1954.

References

Flemish Movement
1954 in Belgium